The 1959 Kentucky gubernatorial election was held on November 3, 1959. Democratic nominee Bert Combs defeated Republican nominee John M. Robsion Jr. with 60.56% of the vote.

Primary elections
Primary elections were held on May 25, 1959.

Democratic primary

Candidates
Bert Combs, Judge of the Kentucky Court of Appeals
Harry Lee Waterfield, former Lieutenant Governor
Jesse N. R. Cecil
James L. Delk

Results

Republican primary

Candidates
John M. Robsion Jr., former U.S. Representatives
Thurman Jerome Hamlin, perennial candidate
Granville Thomas

Results

General election

Candidates
Bert Combs, Democratic
John M. Robsion Jr., Republican

Results

References

1959
Kentucky
Gubernatorial